Burri Sports Club is a Sudanese football club based in Khartoum. They played in the top division in Sudanese football, Sudan Premier League.

History
The idea to create the club was in 1917 but the club was officially founded on 7 November 1935. The team participated in the 1969 African Cup of Champions Clubs after winning the championship the same year.

Stadium
Currently the team plays at the 30,000 capacity Khartoum Stadium.

Honours

National titles
Sudan Premier League: 1
Champion: 1968

Performance in CAF competitions

CAF Champions League
CAF Champions League: 1 appearance

References

External links
Team profile – footballdatabase.eu
Official forum website

1935 establishments in Sudan
Association football clubs established in 1935
Football clubs in Sudan
Sport in Khartoum